A by-election was held for the Australian House of Representatives seat of Curtin on 21 February 1981. This was triggered by the resignation of Liberal MP Victor Garland in order to be appointed High Commissioner of Australia to the United Kingdom. It was held on the same day as by-elections for Boothby and McPherson.

The by-election was won by Liberal Allan Rocher, who had resigned from the Senate to contest it.

Key dates

Results

References

1981 elections in Australia
Western Australian federal by-elections
1980s in Perth, Western Australia